The VLS-1 was the Brazilian Space Agency's main satellite launch vehicle. The launch vehicle was to be capable of launching satellites into orbit. The launch site was located at the Alcântara Launch Center due to its proximity to the equator.

Associated vehicles include the Sonda I, Sonda II, Sonda III and Sonda IV, the VS-30, VS-40 and VSB-30.

The VLS was cancelled after decades of development and high expenditures with poor results and a failed association with Ukraine that slowed the program for years.

History
VLS-1 development started in 1984, after the first launch of the Sonda IV rocket. To date, three prototypes have been built and two launches attempted, departing from the Alcântara Launch Center. During the V1 and V2 prototype launches (VLS-1 V1 and VLS-1 V2) technical problems prevented mission success, but allowed the testing of several vehicle components. The V3 prototype exploded on the launch pad on 22 August 2003, two days before its intended launch date. The 2003 Alcântara VLS accident caused a considerable setback to the Brazilian space program. The V4 prototype was expected to be launched in 2016.

The project was terminated by Brazilian Space Agency in 2016.

The Departamento de Ciência e Tecnologia Aeroespacial (DCTA) (Department of Aerospace Science and Technology) and the Agência Espacial Brasileira (AEB) (Brazilian Space Agency) informed on public audience before the VLS-1 project ended by the Senado Federal (Federal Senate) on February 16, 2016.

VLS-1 schedule

Initial flight test schedule

Final schedule
The V04 prototype was originally scheduled for launch in 2006. Further testing has resumed in 2008. The final VLS-1 schedule was as follows:

VLS Configurations

VLS-R1 test vehicle (1985)
The VLS-R1 test vehicle had two stages, arranged in the following configuration:
 Stage 1 - four S-20 rocket engines
 Stage 2 - one dummy S-20 rocket engine

VLS-R2 test vehicle (1989)
The VLS-R2 test vehicle had two stages, arranged in the following configuration:
 Stage 1 - four S-20 rocket engines
 Stage 2 - one S-20 rocket engine

VLS-XVI 01 sub-orbital test vehicle (2016, planned)
The VLS-XVI 01 sub-orbital test vehicle has three solid fuel rocket stages and boosters, arranged in the following configuration:
 Stage 0 - four S-43 rocket engines
 Stage 1 - one S-43TM rocket engine
 Stage 2 - dummy S-40TM rocket engine
 Stage 3 - dummy S-44 rocket engine

VLS-1 operational configuration (2018, planned)
The VLS-1 has three solid fuel rocket stages and boosters, arranged in the following configuration:
 Stage 0 - four S-43 rocket engines
 Stage 1 - one S-43TM rocket engine
 Stage 2 - one S-40TM rocket engine
 Stage 3 - one S-44 rocket engine

The rocket has four 400N RCS jets, located on the top of the third stage.

Developments

VLM

The VLM (Veículo Lançador de Microssatélites) based on the S50 rocket engine is being studied, with the objective of orbiting satellites up to 150 kg in circular orbits ranging from 250 to 700 km. It will be a three-stage rocket, expected to launch the SHEFEX III mission by the German Aerospace Center (DLR) in 2023.

"Cruzeiro do Sul" (Southern Cross) program

VLS Alfa
In the framework of the proposed Cruzeiro do Sul program, the VLS-1 rocket is the basis of the VLS Alfa project.

L5 rocket based configuration -  three-stage rocket, with the upper stage being liquid-fuel, putting 200 to 400 kg satellites into low equatorial orbits:
 Stage 0 - four S-43 rocket engines
 Stage 1 - one S-43TM rocket engine
 Stage 2 - one S-40TM rocket engine
 Stage 3 - one L5 rocket engine

L75 rocket based configuration - two-stage rocket, with the upper stage being liquid-fuel, putting 500 kg satellites equatorial orbits up to 750 km:
 Stage 0 - four S-43 rocket engines
 Stage 1 - one S-43TM rocket engine
 Stage 2 - one L75 rocket engine

VLS Beta
The VLS Beta is another related project, intended to lift up to 800 kg payloads to an 800 km equatorial orbit. Its first flight was planned for 2020.

Three-stage rocket, with the upper two stages being liquid-fuel.
 Stage 1 - one P40 solid rocket engine
 Stage 2 - one L300 rocket engines
 Stage 3 - one L75 rocket engine

Projected flights are:

VLS Gama 
The VLS Gama is intended to carry up to 1000 kg payloads to an 800 km polar orbit. Three-stage liquid-fuel rocket.

VLS Delta 
The VLS Delta is capable of placing 2000 kg payloads in a geostationary orbit. Three-stage liquid-fuel rocket (VLS BETA body) with two solid fuel boosters.

VLS Epsilon 
The VLS Epsilon is capable of placing 4000 kg payloads in a geostationary orbit. Three-stage liquid-fuel rocket (VLS BETA body) with two liquid-fuel boosters.

Gallery

See also
 Comparison of orbital launchers families

References

External links

   Brazil hopes to launch satellite rocket in 2011
   Atualizações sobre o Projeto do VLS
   VLS terá teste em Setembro

Rockets and missiles
Space launch vehicles of Brazil
Expendable space launch systems